Farz (Persian:  فرض  ) is a Persian word of Arabic origin, also used in Urdu and Hindi, meaning one's duty. It may refer to:

 Fard, religious duty in Islam, mandatory by God.

Films 
Farz is also the title of three Indian Hindi movies:

 Farz (1947 film), starring Agha (actor)
 Farz (1967 film), starring Jeetendra
 Farz (2001 film), starring Sunny Deol and Preity Zinta